Odrintsi, Haskovo Province is a village in the municipality of Ivaylovgrad, in Haskovo Province, in southern Bulgaria. Its former name was "Hallaçlı" (Hallac Murat at 16th Ottoman records) before 1934

References

Villages in Haskovo Province